Heves was an administrative county in the Kingdom of Hungary. Its territory, which is now in northern Hungary, was slightly larger than that of present Heves county. The capital of the county was Eger.

Geography
Heves county shared borders with the Hungarian counties Pest-Pilis-Solt-Kiskun, Nógrád, Gömör-Kishont, Borsod, Hajdú and Jász-Nagykun-Szolnok. It stretched from the Mátra and Bükk mountains to and across the river Tisza. Its area was  around 1910.

History
Heves county was formed in the 13th century. The territory of Heves was conquered by the Ottomans in 1596 (see Ottoman Hungary) and formed part of the Ottoman Eğri Eyalet until it was retaken by the Habsburg Kingdom of Hungary in 1687.

Following the failed Hungarian Revolution of 1848 a period of military dictatorship and centralisation began in Hungary. Heves-Külső-Szolnok was re-partitioned on 13 September 1850 into Heves and Szolnok counties. The border between Heves and Szolnok mostly followed the Tisza river. Both counties formed part of the District of Pest-Ofen during this period. The traditional counties of Hungry, including Heves-Külső-Szolnok, were restored in October 1860.

Heves County was recreated again in the newly arranged Hungarian county system of 1876. Its territory after 1876 was broadly similar to its 1850s iteration but with the addition of Tisza-Füred south of the Tisza.

After World War II, the territory of the county was modified: the region around Pásztó became part of Nógrád county, the area on the left bank of the Tisza (Tiszafüred) became part of Jász-Nagykun-Szolnok county, and an area north of Eger was transferred from Borsod-Abaúj-Zemplén county.

Demographics

Subdivisions

In the early 20th century, the subdivisions of Heves county were:

Notes

References 

States and territories established in 1687
States and territories established in 1876
1596 disestablishments
1765 disestablishments in Europe
States and territories disestablished in 1946
Counties in the Kingdom of Hungary